This is a list of gemstones, organized by species and type.

Minerals
There are over 300 types of minerals that have been used as gemstones. These include:

A–B

Actinolite
Nephrite
Adamite
Aegirine
Afghanite
Agrellite
Algodonite
Alunite
Amblygonite
Analcime
Anatase
Andalusite
Chiastolite
Andesine
Anglesite
Anhydrite
Annabergite
Anorthite
Antigorite
Bowenite
Apatite
Apophyllite
Aragonite
Arfvedsonite
Asbestos
Astrophyllite
Atacamite
Augelite
Austinite
Axinite group:
Ferroaxinite
Magnesioaxinite
Manganaxinite
Tinzenite
Azurmalachite
Azurite
Baryte
Bastnaesite
Bayldonite
Benitoite
Beryl subgroup:
Aquamarine
Maxixe
Emerald
Goshenite
Golden beryl
Heliodor
Morganite
Red beryl (Bixbite)
Beryllonite
Beudantite
Bismutotantalite
Biotite
Boleite
Boracite
Bornite
Brazilianite
Breithauptite
Brookite
Brucite
Bustamite
Bytownite

C–F

Calcite
Manganoan calcite
Caledonite
Canasite
Cancrinite
Vishnevite
Carletonite
Carnallite
Cassiterite
Catapleiite
Cavansite
Celestite 
Ceruleite
Cerussite
Chabazite
Chalcopyrite
Chambersite
Charlesite
Charoite
Childrenite
Chiolite
Chondrodite
Chrysoberyl
Alexandrite
Cymophane
Chromite
Chrysocolla
Chrysotile
Cinnabar
Clinochlore
Clinohumite
Clinozoisite
Clintonite
Cobaltite
Colemanite
Cordierite
Iolite
Cornwallite
Corundum
Ruby
Sapphire
Padparadscha
Golden sheen sapphire
Covellite
Creedite
Crocoite
Cryolite
Cuprite
Danburite
Datolite
Descloizite
Diamond
Bort
Ballas
Diaspore
Dickinsonite
Diopside
Dioptase
Dolomite
Dumortierite
Ekanite
Elbaite
Emerald
Trapiche emerald
Enstatite
Bronzite
Hypersthene
Eosphorite
Epidote
Piemontite
Erythrite
Esperite
Ettringite
Euclase
Eudialyte
Euxenite
Fayalite
Feldspar subgroup:
Andesine
Albite
Anorthite
Anorthoclase
Amazonite
Bytownite
Celsian
Microcline
Moonstone
Adularia
Rainbow
Orthoclase
Unakite
Plagioclase
Albite
Labradorite
Oligoclase
Sanidine
Sunstone
Oregon sunstone
Rainbow lattice sunstone
Fergusonite
Ferroaxinite
Fluorapatite
Fluorapophyllite
Fluorite
Forsterite
Friedelite

G–L

Gadolinite
Gahnite
Gahnospinel
Garnet group:
Pyralspite
Almandine
Pyrope
Spessartine
Ugrandite
Andradite
Demantoid
Melanite
Topazolite
Grossular
Hessonite
Hydrogrossular
Tsavorite
Uvarovite
Almandine-pyrope
Rhodolite
Andradite-grossular
Grandite (Mali garnet)
Pyrope-almandine-spessartine
Malaia garnet
Pyrope-spessartine
Umbalite
Gaspeite
Gaylussite
Gibbsite
Glaucophane
Goethite
Goosecreekite
Grandidierite
Gypsum
Gyrolite
Halite
Hambergite
Hanksite
Hardystonite
Hauyne
Helenite
Hematite
Hemimorphite
Herderite
Hexagonite
Hibonite
Hiddenite
Hodgkinsonite
Holtite
Howlite
Huebnerite
Humite
Hureaulite
Hurlbutite
Hyperitdiabas
Ilmenite
Inderite
Jade
Jadeite
Chloromelanite
Nephrite
Jasper
Jeremejevite
Kainite
Kämmererite
Kaolinite
Kornerupine
Kutnohorite
Kurnakovite
Kyanite
Langbeinite
Lawsonite
Lazulite
Lazurite
Legrandite
Lepidolite
Leucite
Leucophanite
Linarite
Lizardite
Londonite
Ludlamite
Ludwigite

M–Q

Magnesite
Malachite
Marialite-meionite
Wernerite
Marcasite
Meliphanite
Mellite
Mesolite
Microcline
Microlite
Milarite
Millerite
Mimetite
Monazite
Mordenite
Mottramite
Muscovite
Fuchsite
Musgravite
Nambulite
Narsarsukite
Natrolite
Nepheline
Neptunite
Nickeline (Niccolite)
Nosean
Nuummite
Olivine
Opal
Fire opal
Moss opal
Painite
Palygorskite
Papagoite
Pargasite
Parisite
Pectolite
Larimar
Pentlandite
Peridot
Periclase
Perthite
Petalite (castorite)
Pezzottaite
Phenakite
Phlogopite
Phosgenite
Phosphophyllite
Phosphosiderite
Piemontite
Pietersite
Plumbogummite
Pollucite
Polyhalite
Poudretteite
Powellite
Prehnite
Prismatine
Prosopite
Proustite
Psilomelane
Pumpellyite
Chlorastrolite
Purpurite
Pyrite
Pyrargyrite
Pyromorphite
Pyrophyllite
Pyroxmangite
Pyrrhotite
Quartz
Amethyst
Ametrine
Aventurine
Chalcedony
Agate
Iris agate
Onyx
Sardonyx
Bloodstone (Heliotrope)
Carnelian
Chrome chalcedony
Chrysoprase
Dendritic agate
Moss agate
Fire agate (iridescent )
Jasper
Petrified wood
Sard
Citrine
Druzy
Flint
Herkimer quartz
Milky quartz
Prasiolite
Radiolarite
Rose quartz
Rock crystal
Shocked quartz
Smoky quartz
Quartzite

R–Z

Realgar
Rhodizite
Rhodochrosite
Rhodonite
Richterite
Riebeckite
Crocidolite
Rosasite
Rutile
Samarskite
Sanidine
Sapphirine
Sarcolite
Scapolite
Marialite
Meionite
Scheelite
Schizolite
Scorodite
Selenite
Sellaite
Senarmontite
Sepiolite (Meerschaum)
Sérandite
Seraphinite
Serendibite
Serpentine subgroup
Antigorite
Bowenite
Chrysotile
Lizardite
Stichtite
Shattuckite
Shigaite
Shortite
Shungite
Siderite
Sillimanite
Simpsonite
Sinhalite
Smaltite
Smithsonite
Sodalite
Hackmanite
Sogdianite
Sperrylite
Spessartite
Sphalerite
Spinel
Ceylonite
Spodumene
Hiddenite
Kunzite
Triphane
Spurrite
Staurolite
Stibiotantalite
Stichtite
Stolzite
Strontianite
Strontium titanate
Sulfur
Sugilite
Bustamite
Richterite
Sylvite
Taaffeite
Talc
Tantalite
Tektites
Moldavite
Tephroite
Thomsonite
Thaumasite
Tinaksite
Titanite (sphene)
Topaz
Tourmaline subgroup:
Achroite
Chrome
Dravite
Elbaite
Fluor-liddicoatite
Indicolite
Olenite
Paraiba
Rossmanite
Rubellite
Tremolite
Hexagonite
Triphylite
Triplite
Tugtupite
Turquoise
Ulexite
Ussingite
Vanadinite
Variscite
Väyrynenite
Vesuvianite (idocrase)
Californite
Villiaumite
Vivianite
Vlasovite
Wardite
Wavellite
Weloganite
Whewellite
Wilkeite
Willemite
Witherite
Wollastonite
Wulfenite
Wurtzite
Xonotlite
Yugawaralite
Zektzerite
Zeolites
Analcime 
Apophyllite
Chabazite
Goosecreekite
Natrolite
Scolecite
Stellerite
Stilbite
Thomsonite
Zincite
Zinnwaldite
Zircon
Jacinth
Zoisite
Tanzanite
Thulite
Zultanite
Zunyite

Artificial and lab created
There are a number of artificial and lab grown minerals used to produce gemstones. These include:

Lab alexandrite
Lab corundum
Cubic zirconia
Lab diamond
Lab emerald
Fordite
Gadolinium gallium garnet
Lab moissanite
Synthetic opal
Metal-coated crystals hyped as rainbow quartz
Lab spinel
Synthetic turquoise
Terbium gallium garnet
Trinitite
Yttrium aluminium garnet
Yttrium iron garnet

Organic
There are a number of organic materials used as gems, including:
Amber
Ammolite
Ammonoidea
Bone
Copal
Coral
Ivory
Jet
Nacre (Mother of pearl)
Operculum
Pearl
Seashell

Rocks
Some rocks are used as gems, including:

Anthracite
Anyolite
Bauxite
Concretions
Bloodstone (Heliotrope)
Eilat stone
Epidosite
Glimmerite
Goldstone (glittering glass)
Hawk's eye
Helenite (artificial glass made from volcanic ash)
Iddingsite
Kimberlite
Lamproite
Lapis lazuli
Libyan desert glass
Llanite
Maw sit sit
Moldavite
Obsidian
Apache tears
Pallasite
Peridotite (also known as olivinite)
Siilinjärvi carbonatite
Soapstone (also known as steatite)
Tactite
Tiger's eye
Unakite

Chatoyant gems

Some minerals made into gemstones may display a chatoyancy or cat's eye effect, these include:

 Actinolite
 Andalusite
 Apatite
 Beryl
Aquamarine
Emerald
Heliodor
Morganite
 Beryllium
 Beryllonite
 Calcite
 Cerussite
 Chrysoberyl
 Danburite
 Diaspore
 Diopside
 Enstatite
 Garnet
 Grandidierite
 Hawk's eye
 Hypersthene
 Iolite
 Kornerupine
 Kunzite
 Kyanite
 Moonstone
 Opal
 Peridot
 Peristerite (Albite variety)
 Pezzottaite
 Phenakite
 Prasiolite
 Prehnite
 Quartz
 Rhodonite
 Rutile
 Scapolite
 Selenite
 Serpentine
Antigorite
Bowenite
 Sillimanite
 Smoky Quartz
 Spinel
 Sunstone
 Tanzanite
 Tiger's Eye
 Topaz
 Tourmaline
 Ulexite
 Zircon

Asterism
 Corundum
 Ruby
 Sapphire

See also
 List of individual gemstones

References

Gemstones of the World revised 5th edition, 2013 by Walter Schumann 
Smithsonian Handbook: Gemstones by Cally Hall, 2nd ed. 2002 

Species